Roanoke County is a county located in the U.S. state of the Commonwealth of Virginia. As of the 2020 census, the population was 96,929. Its county seat is Salem, but the county administrative offices are located in the unincorporated Cave Spring area of the county.

Roanoke County is part of the Roanoke, Virginia Metropolitan Statistical Area and located within the Roanoke Region of Virginia.

The independent cities of Roanoke and Salem (incorporated as such in 1884 and 1968 respectively) are located within the boundaries of Roanoke County, but are not a part of the county.  The town of Vinton is the only municipality within the county.  While significant areas of the county are rural and mountainous, most residents live in the suburbs near Roanoke and Salem in the Roanoke Valley.

History

The county was established by an act of the Virginia Legislature on March 30, 1838, from the southern part of Botetourt County. It was named for the Roanoke River, which in turn was derived from a Native American term for money. Additional territory was transferred to Roanoke County from Montgomery County in 1845. Salem was originally the county seat. When Salem became an independent city, by agreement with the county the Roanoke County Courthouse remained in Salem and the two localities share a jail. However, the county administrative offices were moved to the Cave Spring District.

Geography

Districts
The county is governed by a Board of Supervisors with one representative elected from each of the five magisterial districts:  Catawba, Cave Spring, Hollins, Vinton, and Windsor Hills. Vinton is an incorporated town with an elected town council and town manager.

Adjacent counties and cities
 Bedford County, Virginia - East
 Botetourt County, Virginia - Northeast
 Craig County, Virginia - Northwest
 Floyd County, Virginia - Southwest
 Franklin County, Virginia - Southeast
 Montgomery County, Virginia - West
 Roanoke, Virginia - Center (enclave)
 Salem, Virginia - Center (enclave)

Nationally protected areas
 Blue Ridge Parkway (part)
 Jefferson National Forest (part)

Major highways

Demographics

2020 census

Note: the US Census treats Hispanic/Latino as an ethnic category. This table excludes Latinos from the racial categories and assigns them to a separate category. Hispanics/Latinos can be of any race.

2000 Census
As of the census of 2000, there were 85,778 people, 34,686 households, and 24,696 families residing in the county.  The population density was 342 people per square mile (132/km2).  There were 36,121 housing units at an average density of 144 per square mile (56/km2).  The racial makeup of the county was 93.63% White, 3.35% Black or African American, 0.12% Native American, 1.61% Asian, 0.02% Pacific Islander, 0.39% from other races, and 0.89% from two or more races.  1.04% of the population were Hispanic or Latino of any race.

There were 34,686 households, out of which 30.60% had children under the age of 18 living with them, 59.90% were married couples living together, 8.50% had a female householder with no husband present, and 28.80% were non-families. 25.10% of all households were made up of individuals, and 10.10% had someone living alone who was 65 years of age or older.  The average household size was 2.41 and the average family size was 2.88.

In the county, the population was spread out, with 22.70% under the age of 18, 6.60% from 18 to 24, 27.50% from 25 to 44, 27.20% from 45 to 64, and 15.90% who were 65 years of age or older.  The median age was 41 years. For every 100 females there were 89.60 males.  For every 100 females age 18 and over, there were 85.30 males.

The median income for a household in the county was $47,689, and the median income for a family was $56,450. Males had a median income of $39,126 versus $26,690 for females. The per capita income for the county was $24,637.  About 2.70% of families and 4.50% of the population were below the poverty line, including 5.20% of those under age 18 and 4.90% of those age 65 or over.

Politics
Roanoke County is a strongly Republican county in Presidential elections. It was one of the first places in Virginia to turn Republican. No Democrat has carried the county since Franklin D. Roosevelt in 1944, and Jimmy Carter in 1976 is the last Democrat to garner even 40 percent of the vote. 

However, the independent city of Roanoke itself is more Democratic than the county's average and has voted for Democrats in each presidential election since 1988.

Education
There are five public high schools located in Roanoke County:
 Cave Spring
 Glenvar
 Hidden Valley
 Northside
 William Byrd

Hollins University, a member of the Old Dominion Athletic Conference, is located in northern Roanoke County, near the Botetourt County border. Roanoke College, also a member of the Old Dominion Athletic Conference, is located in the independent city of Salem within the boundaries of Roanoke County; the former county courthouse on Main Street is now a college academic building.

Notable people

Notable sports figures from Roanoke County include Tiki Barber, Ronde Barber, J. J. Redick, all of whom attended and graduated from Cave Spring High School in Southwest Roanoke County.

Communities

Town
 Vinton

Census-designated places
 Cave Spring
 Glenvar
 Hollins

Other unincorporated communities

 Back Creek
 Bent Mountain
 Bonsack
 Catawba
 Clearbrook
 Fort Lewis
 Hanging Rock
 Masons Cove
 Mount Pleasant
 Oak Grove
 Penn Forest
 Poages Mill

Many of these CDPs and unincorporated areas have mailing addresses in the cities of Roanoke and Salem.

See also
 National Register of Historic Places listings in Roanoke County, Virginia

References

Bibliography
 Jack, George S. and Edward Boyle Jacobs, (1912). History of Roanoke County, Stone.

External links
 County of Roanoke Homepage
 The Roanoke Valley Convention & Visitors Bureau

 
Virginia counties
1838 establishments in Virginia
Populated places established in 1838